Brakes (previously known as ‘Brake Bros Ltd’) is a food and distribution company supplying food, drink and other products mainly to the catering industry in the UK through more than 20 distribution centres. It provides delivered wholesale and contract logistical services. The company was created in 1958 and headquartered in Ashford, United Kingdom. Brake Bros Limited has been a subsidiary of Sysco Corporation since 5 July 2016 when the latter bought it for $3.1bn.

Its customers include schools, contract caterers, hospitals, hotels, independent dining establishments and various large restaurant chains.

Brakes

Brakes in GB comprises a number of businesses and brands:
 Brakes
 Country Choice (including Bake & Bite)
 Sysco speciality
 Prime Meats
 Brakes Catering Equipment
 Woodward Foodservice

In addition to the head office in Enterprise Park, Ashford, the business has offices and customer care centres across the UK. They also maintain an office in Covent Garden, London, and a number of offices and distribution depots around the UK and France, including separate head offices for each division.

List of Brakes UK depots:
 Aylesford
 Bodelwyddan
 Bodmin
 Brighton
 Corby
 Dundee
 Durham
 Eastleigh
 Grantham
 Harlow
 Hemsworth
 Inverness
 Newark
 Newhouse
 Peterlee
 Portbury
 Premier Park
 Reading
 Tamworth
 Thetford
 Warrington

Company history

Acquisitions

UK Acquisitions since flotation in November 1986

References

Borough of Ashford
Companies based in Kent
Food and drink companies established in 1958
Catering and food service companies of the United Kingdom
1958 establishments in England
2016 mergers and acquisitions
British subsidiaries of foreign companies